Vinai K. Thummalapally (born 1954) was the U.S. Ambassador to Belize. He is the first Indian American ambassador in U.S. history.

Early life
Thummalapally is the son of T. Dharma Reddy, a retired scientist who worked for Andhra Pradesh Forensic Sciences Laboratory, and T. Padmaja.

He came to America in 1974, and attended Occidental College in Los Angeles, where he spent a summer as Barack Obama's roommate.

Prior to his appointment as Ambassador Thummalapally was CEO of MAM-A Inc (formerly known as Mitsui Advanced Media).  He has two patents in optical disc manufacturing design.  Thummalapally has a B.S. degree from California State University and took graduate classes in business administration from both CSU and the University of Tennessee.

References

External links
U.S. Embassy Belmopan: Biography of the ambassador
U.S. Department of State: Biography of Vinai K. Thummalapally

University of Tennessee alumni
Ambassadors of the United States to Belize
Indian emigrants to the United States
Occidental College alumni
Living people
1954 births
American politicians of Indian descent